Baseball was one of the many sports which was held at the 2006 Asian Games in Al-Rayyan, Qatar beginning on November 29, 2006. Six East and Southeast Asian nations participated in the tournament.  Chinese Taipei won its first ever baseball gold medal in the Asian Games when they mounted a ninth inning comeback against Japan in the final game of round robin play.  All games in the baseball competition were held at the Al-Rayyan Sports Club.

Schedule

Medalists

Squads

Results
All times are Arabia Standard Time (UTC+03:00)

Final standing

References

External links
 Official website

 
2006
2006 Asian Games events
Asian Games
2006 Asian Games